The 2016–17 season was the 64th season in CD Lugo ’s history.

Squad

Competitions

Overall

Liga

League table

Copa del Rey

References

CD Lugo seasons
Lugo